Igawa (written: 井川, 伊川 or 飯川) is a Japanese surname. Notable people with the surname include:

, Japanese actress
, Japanese actor 
, Japanese baseball player
, Japanese samurai
, Japanese actor 
, Japanese footballer

References

Japanese-language surnames